Alexander Donald (born 5 June 1948) is a Scottish former footballer who played as a winger for English club Port Vale between 1965 and 1968, and later played in Northern Ireland for Derry City and Ballymena United.

Early life
Donald won the West Lothian County Schools sprint title while at Kirkliston Primary School and then Winchburgh Secondary.

Career
Donald played youth-team football for Winchburgh Albion and Pumpherston Juniors. He had a successful trial with Jackie Mudie's Port Vale over the summer of 1965, having joined in July he signed as a professional by October. He made his debut on 12 January 1966 in a 2–0 defeat by Bradford City at Valley Parade, in what was the youngest ever front-line in the history of the Football League – consisting of Donald (17), Roddy Georgeson (17), Mick Cullerton (17), Paul Bannister (18), and Paul Ogden (19). He played 11 Fourth Division games in 1965–66, before making 24 appearances in the 1966–67 campaign. He featured ten times in the 1967–68 season under Stanley Matthews, before he was given a free transfer in May 1968, and moved on to Derry City. He spent three years with Derry, before turning part-time at Ballymena United whilst working a job as manager at a factory. He was granted a testimonial match against Southampton in 1976 that was attended by George Best and Mick Channon. He served the club as caretaker-manager twice in 1983, taking charge after Ivan Murray left in February; Ian Russell served as manager between April and November, and Jim Platt was appointed manager in December. He returned to the club as assistant to caretaker-manager Gary Erwin in October 1984.

Personal and later life
He married Ann, a radiographer. In 2018, Donald claimed a gold medal in the 400 metres event in his age category at the Scottish Masters Athletics Championships at Grangemouth Stadium.

Career statistics
Source:

References

Footballers from Edinburgh
Scottish footballers
Association football midfielders
Port Vale F.C. players
Derry City F.C. players
Ballymena United F.C. players
English Football League players
NIFL Premiership players
Scottish Junior Football Association players
Scottish football managers
Ballymena United F.C. managers
1948 births
Living people